is the 48th single by Japanese entertainer Akina Nakamori. Written by Kōzō Endō, Nakamori (under the pseudonym "Miran:Miran"), Fredrik Bostrom, Anna Nordell, and Calle Kindbom, the single was released on July 13, 2010, by Universal Sigma. It was also the lead single from her compilation album All Time Best: Original. "Crazy Love" is an original song for the 2010 pachinko machine , and it was released exclusively as a digital download. As such, it did not appear on Oricon's weekly singles chart.

Track listing

References

External links 
 

2010 singles
2010 songs
Akina Nakamori songs
Japanese-language songs
Universal Sigma singles